The Swartberg dwarf chameleon (Bradypodion atromontanum) is a species of chameleon endemic to South Africa.

Taxonomy
For many years a dwarf chameleon of undetermined taxonomic status was known from the Swartberg area. A subsequent phylogenetic study resulted in its description as a new species. Morphologically it can be confused with B. gutturale but the two species are allopatric.

Description 
It is a small chameleon not exceeding 12 cm. It is usually a pale yellow/brown with greenish hues.

Distribution
It is endemic to the Swartberg mountains, Western Cape, South Africa. It occurs in the Swartberg Nature Reserve. It is also found at Groot Swartberg.

Habitat
Swartberg dwarf chameleon is arboreal and inhabits mountain fynbos habitat.

References

Bradypodion
Endemic reptiles of South Africa
Reptiles described in 2006
Taxa named by William Roy Branch
Taxa named by Krystal A. Tolley
Taxa named by Colin R. Tilbury